Zamziran (also Romanized as Zamzīrān) is a village in Melkari Rural District, Vazineh District, Sardasht County, West Azerbaijan Province, Iran. At the 2006 census, its population was 335, in 58 families.

References 

Populated places in Sardasht County